Contrary Creek is a stream in Buchanan County in the U.S. state of Missouri. It is a tributary of the Missouri River.

Contrary Creek was named for the fact it runs in a different direction relative to other nearby streams.

See also
List of rivers of Missouri

References

Rivers of Buchanan County, Missouri
Rivers of Missouri